is a railway station on the Hakodate Main Line in Yakumo, Futami District, Hokkaido, Japan, operated by Hokkaido Railway Company (JR Hokkaido).

Lines
Yakumo Station is served by the Hakodate Main Line, and is numbered "H54".

Station layout
Yakumo Station has a single side platform (platform 1) and an island platform (platforms 3 and 4) connected by a footbridge.

Platforms

Adjacent stations

History
The station opened on 3 November 1903. With the privatization of Japanese National Railways (JNR) on 1 April 1987, the station came under the control of JR Hokkaido.

See also
 List of railway stations in Japan

External links

 JR Hokkaido station information 

Railway stations in Hokkaido Prefecture
Stations of Hokkaido Railway Company
Railway stations in Japan opened in 1903
Yakumo, Hokkaido